{{Infobox album
| name       = The Mountain
| type       = EP
| artist     = Palace
| cover      = Mountaincd.jpg
| alt        =
| released   = 1995
| recorded   =
| venue      =
| studio     =
| genre      =
| length     =
| label      = Drag CityDC71 (US, 12", CDs)[[Palace Records/;|Palace]]PR3 (US, 12", CDs)DominoRUG 35T/CD (UK, 12", CDs)
| producer   =
| prev_title = Hope
| prev_year  = 1994
| next_title = Songs Put Together For (The Broken Giant)
| next_year  = 1996
}}The Mountain'' by Palace is a Will Oldham EP released in 1995. The EP is a compilation of two previously released Oldham singles, "West Palm Beach" / "Gulf Shores" (1994) and "The Mountain" / "(End of) Travelling" (1995).

Track listing
"The Mountain"
"(End of) Travelling"
"Gulf Shores"
"West Palm Beach"

1995 EPs
Will Oldham albums